Errezil is a town in the province of Gipuzkoa in the autonomous community of Basque Country, located in the north of Spain. According to the 2016 Basque sociological survey, Errezil has the largest percentage of Basque language speakers of any municipality in the Basque Country, with over 90% of Errezil respondents reporting Basque as their first language and/or reporting speaking Basque at home.

References

External links
Official Website  with information available in Basque, English  and Spanish.
ERREZIL in the Bernardo Estornés Lasa - Auñamendi Encyclopedia (Euskomedia Fundazioa) (information available in Spanish).

Municipalities in Gipuzkoa